Gerardo L. Del Tufo (November 6, 1909 – October 14, 1995) was an American politician who served in the New Jersey State Legislature as a member of the Republican Party.  

A lawyer from Newark, Del Tufo was a graduate of John Marshall College and John Marshall Law School.  He was elected to the New Jersey General Assembly in 1953, and served one two-year term. He served on the Newark Board of Education from 1958 to 1964.  He was elected to the New Jersey State Senate in 1967.  He did not seek re-election to the State Senate in 1971, but instead ran successfully for a seat on the Essex County Board of Chosen Freeholders. He lost a bid for re-election in 1974.

References

County commissioners in New Jersey
Republican Party New Jersey state senators
New Jersey lawyers
Republican Party members of the New Jersey General Assembly
Marshall University alumni
Politicians from Newark, New Jersey
1909 births
1995 deaths
20th-century American lawyers
20th-century American politicians
Lawyers from Newark, New Jersey